The Syrian Social Nationalist Party – Intifada Wing or Abd al-Masih Wing is a splinter group of the Syrian Social Nationalist Party.

The split had its roots in how George Abd al-Masih had utilized his post as SSNP chairman to order the assassination of Adnan al-Malki in April 1954, in order to settle a personal score and without consulting the party leadership. The killing of al-Malik brought upon SSNP a massive crack-down in Syria. After his expulsion from SSNP in 1957, Abd al-Masih continued to operate his own faction. The Abd al-Masih wing remained a relatively small force. Abd al-Masih still led the group as of the 1980s.

The party traditionally did not contest elections in Lebanon. During the civil uprising phase of the Syrian Civil War followers of the party participated in support of the Syrian government and the Syrian Arab Army. As of 2018 the party is led by Dr. Ali Haidar, the incumbent Minister of Reconciliation in Syria. Ali Haidar's SSNP supported the re-election of Bashar al-Assad.

References

External links

Nationalist parties in Syria
Political parties established in 1957
Political parties in Lebanon
Political parties in Syria
Syrian Social Nationalist Party